Habu (Habun) is a language spoken in central East Timor.

The classification of Habu is unclear. Structurally, it is Malayo-Polynesian. However, its vocabulary is largely Papuan, similar to that of Makasae.

References

Languages of East Timor
Timor–Babar languages